Black Beetle may refer to:

Insects
 One of a number of beetles:
 Oriental cockroach (Blatta orientalis), or black beetle
Heteronychus arator, the African black beetle
 Black beetle virus

Comics
 Black Beetle (DC Comics), a fictional character
 The Black Beetle (Dark Horse Comics), a 2012 comic book based on a character of the same name

Music
 Black Beetle, a band featuring Joan Wasser
 "Black Beetles", a 2015 song from B4.Da.$$ by Joey Badass

Vehicle
 The M-497 Black Beetle, an experimental jet-powered locomotive test bed

See also
 Beetle (disambiguation)
 "Black Beatles", a 2016 song by Rae Sremmurd
 Billy Preston, American musician sometimes called "the Black Beatle" for his collaboration with The Beatles